Pepper's Ghost was a band from Philadelphia, Pennsylvania. Their release, Shake The Hand That Shook The World, produced by Andy Johns is available through Hybrid Recordings.

Though their playing style was categorized as rock, they have also used influences from such subgenres as blues rock and Southern rock.

In early 2005, Pepper's Ghost joined Ashlee Simpson on her Thermasilk sponsored tour, along with The Click Five.

The band's mode of transportation on tour was a restored international school bus. Deemed the "Grey Ghost" for its silver/grey color, the bus contains full living quarters for the band.

Their 2005 single "You're in My Heart (Little Pretty)" hit #1 on the Canadian Singles Chart.

Members
Current
Anthony Montesano - vocals, guitar
Michael Montesano - vocals, guitar, Piano
Rob Bennett - piano, Guitar, mandolin, Hammond Organ, vocals
David Hartley - vocals, bass
Zil - drums, percussion, vocals

Former
Bach - bass
Mike Smith - drums
Owen Biddle - bass

Discography

Studio albums

EPs

See also

References

External links
 Myspace
 Purevolume

Rock music groups from Pennsylvania
Musical groups from Philadelphia
American pop rock music groups